Hocine Metref (born 1 January 1984) is an Algerian international football player. He currently plays as a defender and midfielder for USM Blida in the Algerian Ligue 2.

Club career
On 5 July 2011 Metref signed a one-year contract with JS Kabylie. On 6 September he made his debut as a starter in a league game against MC Alger.

On 30 July 2012 Metref signed a two-year contract with MC Alger, joining them on a free transfer.

On 14 Septembre 2020 Metref signed a one-year contract with USM Blida, joining them on a free transfer.

Honours
 Chosen as the Best Player of the 2009 North African Cup of Champions

References

External links
 
 
 Profile at DZFoot

1984 births
Algerian footballers
Algeria international footballers
Kabyle people
Living people
Footballers from Algiers
Dijon FCO players
USM Alger players
ES Sétif players
Expatriate footballers in France
Algerian expatriate footballers
Algerian Ligue Professionnelle 1 players
Algeria A' international footballers
Algeria under-23 international footballers
2011 African Nations Championship players
JS Kabylie players
Algeria youth international footballers
MC Alger players
Association football midfielders
Competitors at the 2005 Mediterranean Games
Mediterranean Games competitors for Algeria
21st-century Algerian people